Yamalsky District (Nenets: Я'мал район, Jaꜧmal rajon) is an administrative and municipal district (raion), one of the seven in Yamalo-Nenets Autonomous Okrug of Tyumen Oblast, Russia. It is located in the north and northwest of the autonomous okrug. Its administrative center is the rural locality (a selo) of Yar-Sale. Population: 16,310 (2010 Census);  The population of Yar-Sale accounts for 39.8% of the district's total population.

Ethnic composition (2010):
 Nenets – 64.4%
 Russians – 22.5%
 Tatars – 2.9%
 Ukrainians – 2.4%
 Khanty – 2.2%
 Kalmyks – 0.7%
 Others – 4.9%

References

Notes

Sources

Districts of Yamalo-Nenets Autonomous Okrug